Drosera pygmaea is a carnivorous, rosette-forming biennial or annual herb native to Australia and New Zealand. The specific epithet, which translates as "dwarf" from Latin, is a reference to the very small size of this plant, which grows to between 8 and 18 mm in diameter. Small, pale flowers are produced at the ends of 1- to 3-inch stems. It is perhaps the most well-known of the pygmy sundews.

References

Carnivorous plants of Australia
Carnivorous plants of New Zealand
pygmaea
Caryophyllales of Australia
Eudicots of Western Australia
Flora of South Australia
Flora of Queensland
Flora of New South Wales
Flora of Victoria (Australia)
Flora of Tasmania